Daisuke Ichikizaki (born February 25, 1987) is a former wushu taolu athlete from Japan. Though many of his international victories, he has established himself as one of Japan's most renowned wushu athletes of all time.

Career 
Ichikizaki started training wushu at the age of six. His first major international appearance was at the 2005 World Wushu Championships in Hanoi, Vietnam, where he earned a bronze medal in changquan. He then competed in the men's daoshu and gunshu combined event at the 2005 East Asian Games and won the bronze medal. A year later, he competed at the 2006 Asian Games in Doha, Qatar, and finished eighth overall in men's changquan. Ichikizaki's high placements at the 2007 World Wushu Championships in Beijing, China, qualified him for the men's changquan event at the 2008 Beijing Wushu Tournament. At the competition, he fell short of the bronze medal position by 0.01. His next appearance was at the 2009 World Games in Kaohsiung, Chinese Taipei, where he won the silver medal in changquan. A few months later, he appeared at the 2009 World Wushu Championships in Toronto, Canada, and won a bronze medal once again in changquan. Shortly after, he won the silver medal in men's changquan at the 2009 East Asian Games in Hong Kong.

Ichikizaki's next competition was at the 2010 World Combat Games in Beijing, China, where he won the silver medal in men's changquan. Near the end of the year, he competed in the 2010 Asian Games in Guangzhou, China, and won the first medal for the Japanese delegation at the games which was a silver medal in men's changquan. A year later, Ichikizaki competed at the 2011 World Wushu Championships and won a bronze medal in gunshu.

Two years later, he competed in the 2013 World Wushu Championships and won his first silver medal at the WWC which was in gunshu. Shortly after, Ichikizaki competed in the 2013 East Asian Games in Tianjin, China, A year later, he competed in the 2014 Asian Games in Incheon, South Korea, and won the bronze medal in men's changquan which was also the first medal for Japan at the games. As his last competition, he appeared at the 2015 World Wushu Championships in Jakarta. Indonesia, and won a silver medal in changquan.

See also 

 List of Asian Games medalists in wushu

References

External links 

 Athlete profile at the 2008 Beijing Wushu Tournament

1987 births
Living people
Japanese wushu practitioners
Wushu practitioners at the 2006 Asian Games
Wushu practitioners at the 2010 Asian Games
Wushu practitioners at the 2014 Asian Games
Competitors at the 2008 Beijing Wushu Tournament
World Games medalists in wushu
Medalists at the 2010 Asian Games
Medalists at the 2014 Asian Games
Asian Games silver medalists for Japan
Asian Games bronze medalists for Japan
Sportspeople from Osaka Prefecture